Yoshi's Crafted World is a platform video game developed by Good-Feel and published by Nintendo for the Nintendo Switch. The eighth main installment in the Yoshi franchise, it is the spiritual successor to Yoshi's Woolly World. The game was revealed at E3 2017, and was released worldwide on March 29, 2019. It follows the Yoshis as they venture to collect the scattered gems of the Sundream Stone, which has the ability to grant wishes, before Kamek and Baby Bowser can.

Yoshi's Crafted World received generally positive reviews from critics, who praised its visuals, level design and gameplay, although the game was criticized for its soundtrack and lack of difficulty. It sold over 1 million copies worldwide in three days and more than 3 million by December 2021, making it one of the best-selling games on the system.

Gameplay 

The game is a side-scrolling platformer where 3D characters are moved on a 2.5D plane. The player is also able to move and interact in a third dimension, with travel forwards and backwards enabled in sections of levels, and the ability to throw eggs at scenery and other elements of the foreground and background. Outside of this new mechanic, the game plays similar to prior Yoshi games, where the player may use Yoshi's tongue to eat enemies or other objects, turn them into eggs, and throw them outwardly into the level. As in previous Yoshi games, flowers can be found in levels, which can be used to unlock paths on the world map.

In addition to the frontside, each level also has a backside, which can be played after completion. Players must find up to three Poochy Pups there and bring them to the finish line, for which they receive one flower per returned Poochy Pup. If they succeed in doing so within the given time period, they receive another flower.

The game features a two-player multiplayer mode, where each player maneuvers their own Yoshi through the game's levels.

Synopsis

The story begins with the Yoshis, who live peacefully on Yoshi's Island. At the topmost peak of the island sits a gem-set artifact known as the Sundream Stone, which possesses the power to "make anyone's wildest dreams come true". One day, when Kamek and Baby Bowser attempt to steal the stone, its gems are sent flying across the world, leaving Yoshi and his friends to recover them.

For most of the game, the stone rests in a dark forest guarded by the Yoshis not exploring. When the Yoshis reattach a Dream Gem, the colors on the actual stone that is the color of the Dream Gem are restored. During the final level, the Yoshis find the last Dream Gem, only for Kamek and Baby Bowser to steal it and the Stone with the other four gems. Baby Bowser then uses the stone to create a robot named The Great King Bowser, the penultimate boss. After its defeat Kamek uses the stone to grow Baby Bowser giant, which leads into the final boss fight against Mega Baby Bowser. Afterwards, the Yoshis reattach the gems (which were detached again after the defeat of Mega Baby Bowser) and restore the Sundream Stone, which, with the Yoshis' dreams, creates an airship that is used to fly all of them back to Yoshi's Island. Following the completion of the story additional challenges and levels are unlocked for more gameplay.

Development 
The game was announced at E3 2017 and was scheduled for a 2018 release. Footage of the game was shown during the Nintendo Treehouse Live event at E3 2017, where footage of the front and backsides of multiple levels were shown. The reveal footage showed the game taking a cardboard cutout-type art style for the game's graphics, similar to how Yoshi's Woolly World was themed around characters and worlds made out of wool and Kirby's Epic Yarn with its yarn-based themes. The game was built using Unreal Engine 4. In June 2018, Nintendo confirmed that the game was delayed and would be released in 2019. In January 2019, Nintendo announced in a standalone tweet that Yoshi's Crafted World would release on March 29, 2019. In the final game, it appears as though the ability to "flip" the world has been overhauled since its reveal, as overall emphasis on the mechanic has been lowered dramatically. Certain auxiliary mechanics shown off at the reveal, such as the ability to flip the viewpoint in multiplayer via a simultaneous ground-pound maneuver, have been removed completely, and instead the flipping mechanic exists as a second bonus "run" through a level, in which Yoshi must find several "Poochy Pups" and bring them to the goal. The game supports all Amiibo, most of them granting players random crafted costumes. Any Mario-related Amiibo, however, including the Yoshi soft dolls from Woolly World, granted players special costumes based on the character used.

Reception 

Yoshi's Crafted World received "generally favorable reviews" according to review aggregator Metacritic, with a score of 79/100. Critics lauded the charm of the game with its level design and graphics, as well as its innovative gameplay formula, though the soundtrack and lack of difficulty was criticized.

Sales
Yoshi's Crafted World debuted at the top of the UK all-format and individual-format sales charts; the first Yoshi game to do so. The game also debuted first in Japan, launching with 53,327 physical sales; the best launch in the series since 2014's Yoshi's New Island. As of July 2019, it has sold over 150,000 copies in Japan. As of March 31, 2019, the game has sold 1.11 million copies worldwide. The 2022 CESA Games White Papers revealed that Yoshi's Crafted World had sold 3.01 million units, as of December 2021.

Awards

Notes

References

Further reading

External links 
 

2019 video games
Multiplayer and single-player video games
Good-Feel games
Nintendo Switch games
Nintendo Switch-only games
Platform games
Side-scrolling video games
Unreal Engine games
Video games developed in Japan
Video games produced by Takashi Tezuka
Video games set on fictional islands
Video games about size change
Video games that use Amiibo figurines
Yoshi video games